Ravi D. Vakil (born February 22, 1970) is a Canadian-American mathematician working in algebraic geometry.

Education and career
Vakil attended high school at Martingrove Collegiate Institute in Etobicoke, Ontario, where he won several mathematical contests and olympiads. After earning a BSc and MSc from the University of Toronto in 1992, he completed a PhD in mathematics at Harvard University in 1997 under Joe Harris.  He has since been an instructor at both Princeton University and MIT.  Since the fall of 2001, he has taught at Stanford University, becoming a full professor in 2007.

Contributions
Vakil is an algebraic geometer and his research work spans over enumerative geometry, topology, Gromov–Witten theory, and classical algebraic geometry. He has solved several old problems in Schubert calculus.  Among other results, he proved that all Schubert problems are enumerative over the real numbers, a result that resolves an issue mathematicians have worked on for at least two decades.

Awards and honors
Vakil has received many awards, including an NSF CAREER Fellowship,  a Sloan Research Fellowship, an American Mathematical Society Centennial Fellowship, a G. de B. Robinson prize for the best paper published (2000) in the Canadian Journal of Mathematics and the Canadian Mathematical Bulletin, and the André-Aisenstadt Prize from the Centre de Recherches Mathématiques at the Université de Montréal (2005), and the Chauvenet Prize (2014)..

In 2012 he became a fellow of the American Mathematical Society.

Mathematics contests
He was a member of the Canadian team in three International Mathematical Olympiads, winning silver, gold (perfect score), and gold in 1986, 1987, and 1988 respectively. He was also the fourth person to be a four-time Putnam Fellow in the history of the contest.  Also, he has been the coordinator of weekly Putnam preparation seminars at Stanford.

References

External links
 Ravi Vakil's Home Page
 
 

1970 births
University of Toronto alumni
Harvard Graduate School of Arts and Sciences alumni
Stanford University faculty
Algebraic geometers
20th-century American mathematicians
21st-century American mathematicians
Canadian mathematicians
People from Etobicoke
Putnam Fellows
Living people
Canadian people of Indian descent
Fellows of the American Mathematical Society
International Mathematical Olympiad participants